Wolfgang Hönig (born 21 January 1954) is a retired East German rower who won two world titles, in the single sculls in 1974 and in the quadruple sculls in 1975.

References

1954 births
Living people
German male rowers
World Rowing Championships medalists for East Germany